Edward James Nestor (12 January 1920 – 16 June 2010) was an Australian cyclist. He competed at the 1948 Summer Olympics and 1956 Summer Olympics. Nestor also set the fastest time in the amateur Goulburn to Sydney Classic in 1949 run from Goulburn to Enfield.

References

External links
 

1920 births
2010 deaths
Australian male cyclists
Commonwealth Games competitors for Australia
Cyclists at the 1954 British Empire and Commonwealth Games
Olympic cyclists of Australia
Cyclists at the 1948 Summer Olympics
Cyclists at the 1956 Summer Olympics
Australian track cyclists
People from Jamestown, South Australia
20th-century Australian people
21st-century Australian people